The Oregon Trunk Rail Bridge or Celilo Bridge is a single-track railroad bridge opened in 1912 over the Columbia River in the Pacific Northwest of the United States.  It consists of eight steel truss spans and several deck girder spans, and since 1957 it has included a vertical-lift section.  The bridge was designed by engineer Ralph Modjeski and erected by the Missouri Valley Bridge & Iron Co., of Leavenworth, Kansas.

It is part of the Wishram, Washington to Bend, Oregon line of the BNSF Railway (formerly the Oregon Trunk line of the Spokane, Portland and Seattle Railway). The bridge is downstream of the site of Celilo Falls, now submerged by water impounded by The Dalles Dam. The Celilo Canal passed beneath the southernmost span, which was a swing span. Completion of The Dalles Dam in 1957 inundated the canal. The new lift span's first complete raising and lowering took place on June 21, 1957, and the bridge reopened to rail traffic the following day. The swing span, to the south of the lift span, remains in place, but it ceased to be used after the lift span was installed. It was "permanently locked in place" in October 1956, for the start of work to modify the bridge.

All of the bridge's piers rest on rocks that were normally exposed during low water periods. During periods of high water, this stretch of the Columbia River became raging rapids, so the piers were built during low water. The north end of the bridge is a wye, where the rail line from Bend meets the BNSF Portland to Pasco mainline. On the south end of the bridge, the line crosses over and interchanges with the Union Pacific mainline.

When built, the bridge's longest span was a  fixed span located just to the north of the swing span; that section was later replaced by a lift span.

See also
 List of crossings of the Columbia River
 Yancopin Bridge – bridge in which a swing span was added to replace a vertical-lift span

References

External links

 1915 photo in the Washington State History Museum's collection
 Circa 1911 image during bridge construction.

Railroad bridges in Oregon
Railroad bridges in Washington (state)
Bridges completed in 1912
Columbia River Gorge
Vertical lift bridges in the United States
Vertical lift bridges in Oregon
Swing bridges in Oregon
Towers in Washington (state)
BNSF Railway bridges
Spokane, Portland and Seattle Railway
Bridges over the Columbia River
Transportation buildings and structures in Klickitat County, Washington
Transportation buildings and structures in Wasco County, Oregon
1912 establishments in Oregon
1912 establishments in Washington (state)
Steel bridges in the United States
Pratt truss bridges in the United States